Milners Corner is an unincorporated community in Hancock County, Indiana, in the United States.

History
Milners Corner was named in 1850 for James Milner. A post office was established at Milners Corner in 1868, and remained in operation until it was discontinued in 1903.

References

Populated places in Hancock County, Indiana